Julie Zhuo is a Chinese-American businesswoman and computer scientist. She was the vice president of product design at Facebook and now co-founder at Inspirit. Zhuo is the author of The Making of a Manager (2019).

Early life and education 
Zhuo is from Shanghai. When she was five years old, her family moved to Texas. She studied computer science and graduated from Stanford University.

Career 
In May 2006, Zhuo became the first intern at Facebook. She became a manager at the age of 25. Zhuo is the vice president of product and design.

She wrote the book The Making of a Manager: What to Do When Everyone Looks to You. The book was published in 2019.

Personal life 
Zhuo has three children. She and her husband live in California.

References

External links 
 
 

Living people
Year of birth missing (living people)
Businesspeople from Shanghai
Chinese women computer scientists
American computer scientists
Facebook employees
Stanford University alumni
Chinese emigrants to the United States
20th-century American women scientists
20th-century American scientists
21st-century American scientists
21st-century American women scientists
Businesspeople from Texas
Scientists from Texas